Roberto Carlos Peña Grueso (born March 1, 1984) is a Colombian footballer.

References

External links
 BDFA profile

1984 births
Living people
Footballers from Cali
Colombian footballers
Colombian expatriate footballers
Deportes Quindío footballers
C.D. FAS footballers
Aston Villa F.C. players
Deportivo Marquense players
Deportivo Coatepeque players
Antigua GFC players
Association football defenders
Colombian expatriate sportspeople in El Salvador
Colombian expatriate sportspeople in Guatemala
Expatriate footballers in El Salvador
Expatriate footballers in Guatemala